John Rutherford may refer to:

Sports
 Jock Rutherford (1884–1963), English footballer
 John Rutherford (footballer) (1907–unknown), English footballer
 John Rutherford (rugby union) (born 1955), Scottish international rugby player
 John Rutherford (Australian cricketer) (1929-2022), Australian cricketer, sometimes known as Jack Rutherford
 John Rutherford (Hampshire cricketer) (1890–1943), English cricketer
 John Rutherford (Cambridge University cricketer) (1935-2013), English cricketer
 Johnny Rutherford (born 1938), retired U.S. automobile racer
 Johnny Rutherford (baseball) (1925–2016), Major League Baseball pitcher

Others

 John Rutherford (physician) (1695–1779), Scottish professor father of Daniel Rutherford 
 Sir John Rutherford, 1st Baronet (1854–1932), British Conservative politician, MP for Darwen 1895–1922
 Hugo Rutherford (John Hugo Rutherford, 1887–1942), British Conservative politician, MP for Edge Hill, 1931–1935
 John Rutherford (Conservative politician) (1904–1957), British Conservative politician, MP for Edmonton, 1931–1935
 John Rutherford (Florida politician) (born 1952), U.S. representative for Florida's 4th congressional district
 John D. Rutherford (born 1941), fellow at The Queen's College, Oxford, and a translator of Don Quixote
 John Gunion Rutherford (1857–1923), Canadian veterinarian, civil servant, and politician

See also
 John Rutherfoord (1792–1866), governor of Virginia
 John Rutherfoord (judge) (1861–1942), Virginia state legislator and judge
 Jack Rutherford (disambiguation)